Karyamukti is a village in district of Campaka (id) in Cianjur Regency, West Java, Indonesia. It is the location of Gunung Padang Megalithic Site, which lies on a hill made of mouth of an extinct volcano.

See also

 Candi of Indonesia
 Greater India
 Hinduism in Indonesia
 History of Indian influence on Southeast Asia
 Indianisation
 Prambanan Temple Compounds, UNESCO heritage listed 6th to 9th century CE Hindu temple in Central Java built by Shailendra dynasty of Mataram Kingdom
 Sunda Kingdom, Sundanese Hindu kingdom from 669 to 1579 CE in western and central Java including Gunung Padang site.
 Taruma Kingdom, 2nd and 6th centuries CE Indianised Hindu kingdom of Western Java to which some construction at Gunung Padang corresponds to.

References 

Cianjur Regency
Villages in West Java
Archaeology of Indonesia
Tourist attractions in West Java
History of West Java
Places in Hindu worship